Webster County Courthouse is a historic county courthouse in Preston, Georgia, the county seat for Webster County, Georgia.

It was built in 1915 and was designed in Neoclassical style. It was added to the National Register of Historic Places on September 18, 1980. It is located on Courthouse Square. It was designed by T.F. Lockwood, Sr.

The courthouse is two stories and made of red brick. The white cupola atop the building was added after the attack on Pearl Harbor and local civil defense volunteers stood watch on the cupola every day until the war's end.

See also
National Register of Historic Places listings in Webster County, Georgia

References

County courthouses in Georgia (U.S. state)
Courthouses on the National Register of Historic Places in Georgia (U.S. state)
Neoclassical architecture in Georgia (U.S. state)
Government buildings completed in 1914
Buildings and structures in Webster County, Georgia
National Register of Historic Places in Webster County, Georgia